Chamoling (Tibetan: ཁྲ་མོ་གླིང་, Chinese: 长毛岭; Pinyin: Chángmáolǐng) is a township in Riwoqê County, Tibet Autonomous Region of China. It lies at an altitude of 4,651 metres (15,262 feet).

See also
List of township-level divisions of the Tibet Autonomous Region

Notes

Populated places in Chamdo
Township-level divisions of Tibet